The 2013 Women's Rugby League World Cup was the fourth staging of the Women's Rugby League World Cup. The tournament was held in Great Britain from 26 October, culminating in the final between Australia and New Zealand on 14 July. It was held at Headingley Rugby Stadium, Leeds. Four teams took part and these teams were: Australia, England, France and New Zealand.

Participating teams
Each team was to play the other three once during the round robin tournament. The top two finishing teams would then contest the final.

The competition featured four teams: 3 time World Cup champions New Zealand, the tournament hosts England, Australia and France

Squads

Round robin

New Zealand v. France

England v. Australia

Australia v. France

England v. New Zealand

Australia v. New Zealand

England v. France

Third Place Play Off

Final
The fourth Women's Rugby League World Cup were held in Leeds alongside the student and police World Cups, with the final taking place at Headingley Rugby Stadium, Leeds.

See also

Rugby league

References

External links

2013 Rugby League World Cup
Women's Rugby League World Cup
World Cup
Women's rugby league in England